The 1983 Division I NCAA Men's Lacrosse Championship game was played between the Syracuse Orange men's lacrosse and the Johns Hopkins Blue Jays men's lacrosse in front of 15,672 fans. Syracuse won the championship game 17-16 and won its first NCAA title.

Overview
In an exciting NCAA lacrosse finals, Syracuse capped off a 14 and 1 season with its first NCAA championship and fifth overall lacrosse title as they defeated Johns Hopkins, 17 to 16. The Orange, led by Brad Kotz and Tim Nelson, scored eight straight goals in less than nine minutes in the second half to clinch the title after Hopkins had gone up 12 to 5 midway through the third quarter.

Syracuse was seeded second and hosted the first round and semifinal games. The Orange beat Penn, the seventh-seed, 11-8 at Syracuse's J.S. Coyne Stadium. In the semifinals in the Carrier Dome, the Orange beat Maryland 12-5 behind Randy Lundblad’s one goal and four assists and Travis Solomon’s 22 saves.

In the finals, the Blue Jays had a 12-5 lead with less than seven minutes to play in the third period when the Orange rallied. Syracuse outscored the Blue Jays 4 to 1 to close out the third period and then added six straight goals in the fourth to go up 15-13. Hopkins tied the score at 15, but goals by Brad Kotz and Lundblad gave the Orange a two-goal cushion with Del Dressell scoring the final Hopkins goal. Tim Nelson had two goals and six assists in the finals, to finish as the tournament’s leading scorer with 15 points. Kotz scored five goals, all in the second half and was named Most Outstanding Player. Travis Solomon made 18 saves for the Orange.

Late in the third quarter, team captain and defenseman Darren Lawlor scored a key goal left-handed which provided a spark for the Orangemen. Overcoming a seven goal deficit against a Hopkins team participating in its seventh straight title game, Lawlor and the other Orange seniors provided the spark. But the offensive punch came primarily from sophomores, including midfielder Brad Kotz of West Genesee and Tim Nelson, the transfer from North Carolina State. Nelson's pass to Randy Lundblad for an open-net goal with 1:09 left locked up the title for the Orange.

For Hopkins, Dressel was outstanding exhibiting one on one skills on par with the Orange's most athletic players, finishing with three goals and one assist in the finals.

Syracuse and Johns Hopkins would go on to meet in the NCAA finals five more times, the last time in 2008. This was Hopkins' seventh straight NCAA final.

Bracket

Box scores

Tournament Finals

Tournament Semi-finals

Tournament First Round

Tournament outstanding players
Brad Kotz, Syracuse (Named the tournament's Most Outstanding Player)

See also
1983 NCAA Women's Lacrosse Championship
1983 NCAA Division III Lacrosse Championship

References

External links
1983 NCAA Lacrosse Title Syracuse Hopkins part1 on YouTube
1983 NCAA Lacrosse Title Syracuse Hopkins part2 on YouTube

NCAA Division I Men's Lacrosse Championship
NCAA Division I Men's Lacrosse Championship
NCAA Division I Men's Lacrosse Championship
NCAA Division I Men's Lacrosse Championship
NCAA Division I Men's Lacrosse Championship
NCAA Division I Men's Lacrosse Championship